Lloyd Vernet "Beau" Bridges III (born December 9, 1941) is an American actor and director. He is a three-time Emmy, two-time Golden Globe and one-time Grammy Award winner, as well as a two-time Screen Actors Guild Award nominee. Bridges was awarded a star on the Hollywood Walk of Fame on April 7, 2003, at 7065 Hollywood Boulevard for his contributions to the television industry. He is the son of actor Lloyd Bridges and elder brother of fellow actor Jeff Bridges.

Early life
Bridges was born on December 9, 1941 in Los Angeles, California, the son of actors Lloyd Bridges (1913–1998) and Dorothy Bridges (née Simpson; 1915–2009). He was nicknamed Beau by his parents after Ashley Wilkes' son in Gone with the Wind. His younger brother is actor Jeff Bridges, and he has a younger sister, Lucinda. Another brother, Garrett, died in 1948 of sudden infant death syndrome. Beau has shared a close relationship with Jeff, for whom he acted as a surrogate father during childhood, when their father was busy with work. He and his siblings were raised in the Holmby Hills section of Los Angeles.

Wanting to become a basketball star, he played in his freshman year at the University of California, Los Angeles (UCLA) under legendary coach John Wooden, where he joined Sigma Alpha Epsilon, he later transferred to the University of Hawaii. In 1959, he enlisted in the United States Coast Guard Reserve and served for eight years.

Career
In 1948, Bridges had an uncredited juvenile role in the iconic film noir Force of Evil, and a role as Bertram in No Minor Vices. In 1949 he played a third juvenile role in the film The Red Pony. In the 1962–1963 television season, Bridges, along with his younger brother, Jeff, appeared on their father's CBS anthology series, The Lloyd Bridges Show. He appeared in other television series too, including National Velvet, The Fugitive, Combat, Bonanza, Mr. Novak, and The Loner. In 1965, he guest-starred as Corporal Corbett in "Then Came the Mighty Hunter", Season 2, Episode 3 of the military series, Twelve O'Clock High. He found steady work in television and film throughout the 1970s and 1980s. He appeared in such feature films during that time as The Landlord (1970), The Other Side of the Mountain (1975), Greased Lightning (1977), Norma Rae (1979), Heart Like a Wheel (1983), and The Hotel New Hampshire (1984).

In 1989, in perhaps his best-known role, he starred opposite his brother Jeff as one of The Fabulous Baker Boys. In the 1993–94 television season, Bridges appeared with his father in the 15-episode CBS comedy/western series, Harts of the West, set at a dude ranch in Nevada. In 1995, Bridges starred with his father and his son Dylan in "The Sandkings", the two-part pilot episode of the Showtime science fiction series, The Outer Limits. In 1998, he starred as Judge Bob Gibbs in the one-season Maximum Bob on ABC. He had a recurring role in the Showtime series Beggars and Choosers (1999–2000).

In 2001, he guest-starred as Daniel McFarland, the stepfather of Jack McFarland, in two episodes of the NBC sitcom Will & Grace. He played a single father and college professor in the fantasy adventure film, Voyage of the Unicorn, based on the novel by James C. Christensen.

From 2002 to 2003, he took on the role of Senator Tom Gage, newly appointed Director of the Central Intelligence Agency, in over 30 episodes of the drama series The Agency. In January 2005, he was cast as Major General Hank Landry, the new commander of Stargate Command in Stargate SG-1. He also played the character in five episodes of the spin-off series Stargate Atlantis as well as the two direct to DVD films Stargate: The Ark of Truth and Stargate: Continuum.

His role in the film Smile, with Linda Hamilton and Sean Astin, showcased his personal beliefs in helping others.

In November 2005, he guest-starred as Carl Hickey, the father of the title character in the hit NBC comedy My Name Is Earl. Bridges' character became recurring. Bridges received a 2007 Emmy Award nomination for his performance.

In 2008, Bridges co-starred in the motion picture Max Payne, based on the video game character. The film also starred Mark Wahlberg and Mila Kunis. Bridges portrayed "BB" Hensley, an ex-cop who aides Wahlberg on his quest to bring down a serial killer. The film received mixed reviews, but Bridges' participation was noted for being a positive one. It was not the first motion picture with Bridges regarding the video game world; The Wizard had him in a role as a landscaping company owner who was later found, like his son Jimmy (played by actor Luke Edwards), to have a skill with NES games.

On February 8, 2009, Cynthia Nixon, Blair Underwood, and Bridges won a Grammy Award for Best Spoken Word Album for their recording of Al Gore's An Inconvenient Truth.

In 2009, Bridges guest-starred as Eli Scruggs on the 100th episode of Desperate Housewives and received an Emmy Award nomination for his performance.

In 2010, Bridges signed with Chris Mallick in the production of the film Columbus Circle. On March 19, 2010, it was announced that Bridges would play the role of Joseph 'Rocky' Rockford, the father of private eye Jim Rockford, on the pilot episode of a new version of The Rockford Files, scheduled for production for broadcast in fall 2010. In 2011, he guest-starred as an old boyfriend of matriarch Nora Walker in Brothers and Sisters and as an attorney, estranged from his son Jared Franklin in Franklin & Bash.

On January 3, 2012, Bridges took on the role of J.B. Biggley in the hit revival of the Broadway musical How to Succeed in Business Without Really Trying, taking over for John Larroquette. He was contracted to play the role until July 1, 2012. However, the revival closed May 20, 2012.

On October 3, 2013, Bridges became a major character on the CBS television show The Millers. He plays Tom, the father of two children: son Nathan Miller (Will Arnett) and daughter Debbie (Jayma Mays). Tom, after forty-three years of marriage, has gotten divorced and has moved back in with his daughter, driving her crazy. Bridges joined the series in early March 2013.

Bridges has had several roles in films since then including Underdog Kids and Lawless Range in 2016. He has also had guest roles on the shows Masters of Sex and Code Black.

Awards
Bridges has 14 Emmy Award nominations with three wins. He is the only actor to win the Emmy for Outstanding Supporting Actor In A Miniseries Or Special more than once, with two wins.
 1992 Outstanding Lead Actor In A Miniseries Or Special, for Without Warning: The James Brady Story
 1993 Outstanding Supporting Actor In A Miniseries Or Special, for The Positively True Adventures of the Alleged Texas Cheerleader-Murdering Mom
 1997 Outstanding Supporting Actor In A Miniseries Or Special, for The Second Civil War

Personal life

Bridges married Julie Landfield in 1964, the two divorced in 1974. They have two sons: Casey Bridges (b. 1969) and Jordan Bridges (b. 1973). He married Wendy Treece in 1984. They have three children. Dylan Lloyd Bridges (b. 1984) Emily Beau Bridges (b. 1986) and Ezekiel Jeffrey Bridges (b. 1993). Beau and Wendy have six grandchildren. Lola, Orson, Clark, Oliver, Parker and Mack.

Bridges is a Christian. He has stated that if the script calls for his character to say God's name in vain, he will ask the director if he can change the line. Bridges has been a vegan since 2004.

Bridges, his brother Jeff and late father Lloyd were among six veterans – the others being Jerry Coleman, Bob Feller and Brian Lamb – honored with the Lone Sailor Award by the United States Navy Memorial in 2011. The award recognizes Navy, Marine and Coast Guard veterans who have distinguished themselves in their civilian careers.

Filmography

Film

Television

Awards and nominations

References

Further reading 
 Holmstrom, John. The Moving Picture Boy: An International Encyclopaedia from 1895 to 1995, Norwich, Michael Russell, 1996, p. 229.
 Dye, David. Child and Youth Actors: Filmography of Their Entire Careers, 1914–1985. Jefferson, NC: McFarland & Co., 1988, p. 26.

External links

 
 
 
 
 Chat: Beau Bridges transcript at LifetimeTV.com
 Beau Bridges interview on Texas Archive of the Moving Image about Norma Rae in 1979

1941 births
Living people
Male actors from Los Angeles
American male child actors
American male film actors
American male television actors
American male voice actors
American people of English descent
American people of Irish descent
American people of Swiss-German descent
Audiobook narrators
Best Miniseries or Television Movie Actor Golden Globe winners
Best Supporting Actor Golden Globe (television) winners
Grammy Award winners
Bridges family
Outstanding Performance by a Lead Actor in a Miniseries or Movie Primetime Emmy Award winners
Outstanding Performance by a Supporting Actor in a Miniseries or Movie Primetime Emmy Award winners
20th-century American male actors
21st-century American male actors
United States Coast Guard enlisted
United States Coast Guard reservists
University of Hawaiʻi at Mānoa alumni
University of California, Los Angeles alumni
People from Holmby Hills, Los Angeles